The Hougang Single Member Constituency is a single member constituency (SMC) located in the north-eastern area of Singapore. Its current Member of Parliament is Dennis Tan Lip Fong of the Workers' Party (WP).

History 
The constituency was first formed prior to the 1988 general election and was won by the People's Action Party (PAP) in its debut. 

However, PAP's representation of Hougang SMC would only last three years, when it lost the seat to Low Thia Khiang after an almost 12% swing to the Workers' Party (WP) during the 1991 general election.

From 1991 to 2011, it was one of only two opposition-held (i.e. non-PAP) seats in Parliament. Low contested in Aljunied Group Representation Constituency (GRC) – and won – during the 2011 general election, and was succeeded by Yaw Shin Leong, who retained the seat by defeating PAP candidate Desmond Choo with 65% of the vote.

On 15 February 2012, Yaw was expelled from the party for personal indiscretions, triggering a by-election. He was succeeded by Png Eng Huat, who retained the seat for the party with 62.1% of the vote. 

Png retired prior to the 2020 general election; the WP candidate Dennis Tan Lip Fong retained the seat in that election with 61.2% of the vote.

Constituency profile
The seat is located in the North-East Region of the country, with the closest train station being the namesake Hougang MRT station on the North East Line and the Cross Island Line (currently under construction), although the station itself is not located within the SMC but just outside it, in the adjacent Aljunied GRC – which is also represented by WP MPs. Hougang Community Club and Hougang Neighbourhood Park are located within the constituency. 

The constituency is almost entirely an enclave within Aljunied GRC, except for Hougang ActiveSG Sports Centre which consists of Hougang Stadium, a sports hall and swimming pool that comes under Ang Mo Kio GRC on Hougang SMC's western border. The constituency has been labeled a stronghold for the WP by political analysts, having been retained by the party since 1991.

Town council 
Hougang SMC is managed by the Aljunied-Hougang Town Council, a combined town council that administers both Aljunied GRC and Hougang SMC.

Members of Parliament

Electoral results

Elections in 1980s

Elections in 1990s

Elections in 2000s

Elections in 2010s

Elections in 2020s

References

Further reading

Singaporean electoral divisions
Hougang